Jayme Lawson (born September 19, 1997) is an American actress.

Career
After graduating Juilliard School in May 2019, Lawson landed her first film role in the 2020 film Farewell Amor as Sylvia. In 2019, she gained attention when she was cast in the film The Batman (2022) as Bella Reál, a mayoral candidate for Gotham City. In January 2021, she was cast as a young Michelle Obama in the television series The First Lady (2022). In October 2021, she was confirmed to appear in the upcoming film Till (2022) as Myrlie Evers.

Filmography

Film

Television

Play 
2019 - For Colored Girls Who Have Considered Suicide / When the Rainbow Is Enuf

References

External links
 

1997 births
21st-century American actresses
Place of birth missing (living people)
Juilliard School alumni
Living people